The Great Stand on the Ugra River or the Standing on the Ugra River, also known as the Battle of the Ugra, was a standoff between the forces of Akhmat Khan of the Great Horde, and Grand Prince Ivan III of the Grand Duchy of Moscow in 1480 on the banks of the Ugra River.

After Ivan III stopped paying tribute to the Horde, Akhmat Khan led an army to the river, which ended when both armies departed without conflict. In traditional Russian historiography, it has been interpreted as the end of the "Tatar yoke" in Russia, though some historians believe that the event itself was insignificant and did not change Russo-Tatar relations. Nevertheless, the event is usually regarded as the end of nominal Tatar suzerainty over Russia.

Background
The main Russian defence line ran along the Oka River from Kaluga east toward Nizhny Novgorod. At Kaluga the Oka bends sharply from north to east and the defense line was extended westward along the Ugra River. The land west and south of Kaluga was claimed by Lithuania. At this time Ivan III was uniting the lands north of the Oka. At the same time the Golden Horde was breaking up and the steppe remnant came to be called the Great Horde. Casimir IV Jagiellon of Poland-Lithuania was allied with the Great Horde, while Russia was allied with Crimea against the Horde. In 1472 Akhmed of the Great Horde raided the Oka at Aleksin but was driven off. In 1476 Russia officially stopped paying tribute to the Tatars. In late 1479 Ivan quarreled with his brothers, Andrey Bolshoy and Boris of Volotsk, who began intriguing with Casimir. This internal conflict may have influenced Akhmed's decision to attack.

Campaign

In late May news of the pending invasion reached Moscow. Nesin (2015) says it was the largest Tatar army in the fifteenth century. One faction wanted to flee north, but was overruled. In June Ivan sent troops south to the Oka: to Serpukhov under his son Ivan the Young, to Tarusa under his brother Andrey the Less and Ivan himself to Kolomna. Tatar scouting parties soon appeared south of the Oka.  Russian outposts reported that Akhmed was tending northwest so Russian troops were moved west toward Kaluga. Forces from Tver  moved toward the Ugra.  Around 30 September (date uncertain) Ivan returned to Moscow to meet with his bishops and boyars and major decisions were made. The quarrel with his brothers was settled and their troops began moving toward the Oka. The state treasury and royal family were moved north to Beloozero and some cities were evacuated.  Vasily Nozdrovaty and the exiled Crimean khan Nur Devlet were sent east down the Oka and Volga to attack Akhmed in the rear. Meanwhile, Akhmed had moved northward between the upper Don and Oka and at an uncertain date made camp at Vorotynsk just south of the Ugra-Oka junction on the west side of the Oka. Here he waited for Casimir, who never came. Casimir was tied down fighting the Crimeans in Podolia, but he may have had other reasons. On 3 October Ivan moved to Kremenskoye (then called 'Kremenets' to watch the front. Nesin (2015) gives the Russian front as 60 versts (kilometers), but does not specify its start and end points.

On 6–8 October Akhmed moved his troops up to the Ugra. Fighting began at one o'clock on the eighth and continued for almost four days.  All attempts to cross the river failed, largely because of Russian firearms and because the river was wide enough to make Tatar arrows ineffective. The battlefield extended five kilometers along the Ugra from its mouth westward. Akhmed withdrew two versts (kilometers) south to a place called Luza (location?).  He then tried to secretly move his troops to a place called 'Opakhov', but his movement was detected and the crossing blocked. Ivan began negotiations with Akhmed which led nowhere but gave Ivan time to bring up more troops. Both sides spent the next month watching each other across the river, this being the standoff proper.

It was getting late in the season and both sides knew that once the river froze solid it would no longer be a barrier. Akhmed could concentrate his forces and break the thin Russian line at any point. Ivan's best plan was to pull back and concentrate his force. On 26 October Ivan began moving troops from the Ugra northeast to Kremenskoye and then east to Borovsk.  Here he had a good defensive position to protect Moscow and could strike in any direction if Akhmed chose to advance. Ahmad expected Casimir IV Jagiellon to join him with Lithuanian reinforcements, but as Casimir faced a revolt at home, he never showed up. Instead of advancing, on 8 November Akhmed began to withdraw. News of the retreat reached Ivan on 11 November. On his retreat, Akhmed raided 12 Lithuanian towns, including Mtsensk. His son Murtaza raided some villages south of the Oka until the Russians drove him off.   On 28 November Ivan returned to Moscow. In January 1481 Akhmed was killed by Ibak Khan.

Reasons for Akhmed's withdrawal
Karamzin wrote  "It should have been an odd image: two armies ran away from each other, not pursued by anyone", but it is now clear that the two withdrawals were independent. Ivan's motive is clear, but Akhmed's motives are a matter of guesswork. Casimir's failure to appear is clearly important. Nesin thinks that a major factor was the end of Ivan's quarrel with his brothers and the resulting additional troops. The impending Russian winter was a consideration. The longer the standoff lasted the more troops Ivan could bring up while Akhmed's reserves were few and far away. The Tatar horses, and the sheep they drove with them for food, gradually consumed the local fodder. There are reports of disease in his army. Akhmed may have thought Ivan's withdrawal was a ruse to draw him into an ambush, a common steppe tactic. Even if there were no ambush, he would have to fight an army in a prepared position, or try to bypass it. The Tatars preferred hit-and-run raids and Akhmed may not have wished to attack a concentrated army. The sources do not explain why he did not try to outflank the Russian line by moving west. His wise, but seemingly cowardly, withdrawal probably contributed to his death a few months later.

Aftermath 
On 6 January 1481, Akhmat Khan was killed in a clash with the Nogais under Ibak Khan, a princeling from the Khanate of Sibir. In 1502, Crimea destroyed the Great Horde as an organization thereby removing the buffer between Russia and Crimea and leading to a series of Russo-Crimean wars that lasted until 1784.

The effect of the confrontation is debated. Both sides retreated without fighting. According to traditional Russian historiography, the event marked the end of Russian dependency on Tatars overlords. On the other hand, several modern historians regard the confrontation as indecisive, and not having a significant effect on Muscovite–Tatar relations.

In traditional Russian national historiography, the Ugra Standoff is taken as the end of the so-called "Tatar yoke".
Some of the earliest Muscovite sources mentioning the event include:
 The Epistle to the Ugra, written by Vassian Patrikeyev, bishop of Rostov and confidant of Ivan III.
 The anonymous Epistle to Ivan IV (dated  1550s), attributed to metropolitan Makarii or priest Silvestr.
 The anonymous Kazan Chronicle alias Kazan History (dated  1560s).

Halperin (1987) called the view that the Stand marked 'the definitive event in the Russian liberation' "oversimplified", saying 'Moscow had probably ceased paying tribute to the Great Horde sometime in the 1470s, yet continued formal relations' for 20 more years, and 'Muscovy continued to pay tribute, of a sort, to various other Tatar khanates. It was not until three quarters of a century later that Muscovite ideologues began to ascribe to this confrontation the significance it currently holds in Russian historical writings.' Janet L B. Martin (1995) dismissed the significance of the stand of the Ugra as 'embellished': '[T]he non-battle has commonly, although erroneously, been identified as the event that ended Tatar domination over the Russian lands. The so-called Battle of the Ugra neither broke the Tatar yoke nor destroyed the close relations Muscovy maintained with its Tatar neighbors.' Concurring, and adding that Muscovy continued paying tribute to the Crimean Khanate, Wilson et al. (2022) called it 'a glorified staring contest. Only centuries later did Rus' chronicles see it as marking the independence of the Rus'.'

Perhaps the most important result of the Russo-Crimean alliance was its effect on Lithuania. In 1480–1515, Muscovy (Russia) expanded out of its Oka-Volga cradle west to Smolensk and southwest across the Ugra and down the west side of the Oka as far as Novgorod-Seversky.

See also
Battle of Kulikovo
 Battle of Molodi

Notes

References

Sources 
 
 
 
 
 Nesin, M.K. "On the Reasons for the Withdrawal of Tatar Troops after the Ugra Standoff", 2015, in Russian: http://www.reenactor.ru/ARH/PDF/Nesin_05.pdf (avoid further links to milhist.info which is not secure)

External links 

Conflicts in 1480
Wars involving the Golden Horde
15th century in the Grand Duchy of Moscow